Rangasayee Ramakrishna (born 15/03/1934 in Chidambaram, Cuddalore district, Tamil Nadu, India) is a politician of the Bharatiya Janata  Party. He was a Civil Servant and is a political activist.

He joined the Indian Administrative Service in 1957 and  served in different positions till his retirement in 1992. He is Active Member of  BJP since 1995 and was  Co-convener of Economic Cell of BJP during 1995–2000; He is National Convener of Election Cell of BJP since 1998 and is Permanent Invitee in the National Executive of BJP.

He was elected to Rajya Sabha from state of Karnataka of the ticket of BJP in April 2012.

His wife Dr Shanta Ramakrishna is retired Professor from JNU New Delhi.

References

1934 births
Living people
People from Cuddalore district
Rajya Sabha members from Karnataka
Bharatiya Janata Party politicians from Karnataka